The 1960–61 season was Cardiff City F.C.'s 34th season in the Football League. They competed in the 22-team Division One, then the first tier of English football, finishing fifteenth.

Players

League standings

Results by round

Fixtures and results

First Division

League Cup

FA Cup

Welsh Cup

See also
Cardiff City F.C. seasons

References

Welsh Football Data Archive

Cardiff City F.C. seasons
Cardiff
Card